Marginella subturrita is a species of sea snail, a marine gastropod mollusk in the family Marginellidae, the margin snails.

Description

Distribution

References

 Gofas, S.; Le Renard, J.; Bouchet, P. (2001). Mollusca. in: Costello, M.J. et al. (eds), European Register of Marine Species: a check-list of the marine species in Europe and a bibliography of guides to their identification. Patrimoines Naturels. 50: 180–213
 Cossignani T. (2006). Marginellidae & Cystiscidae of the World. L'Informatore Piceno. 408pp

External links
 Locard A. (1897–1898). Expéditions scientifiques du Travailleur et du Talisman pendant les années 1880, 1881, 1882 et 1883. Mollusques testacés. Paris, Masson. vol. 1 [1897], p. 1–516 pl. 1-22; vol. 2 [1898], p. 1–515, pl. 1–18
 Fischer, P. (1884 ["1883"]). Diagnoses d'espèces nouvelles de mollusques recueillis dans le cours de l'expédition scientifique du "Talisman. Journal de Conchyliologie. 31: 391–394
 Gofas, S.; Luque, Á. A.; Templado, J.; Salas, C. (2017). A national checklist of marine Mollusca in Spanish waters. Scientia Marina. 81(2) : 241–254, and supplementary online material

Marginellidae
Gastropods described in 1883